is the 35th single by Japanese entertainer Miho Nakayama and a collaboration with Mayo Okamoto (as "Mayo"). Written by Okamoto and Nakayama, the single was released on November 1, 1996, by King Records.

Background and release
"Mirai e no Present" was Nakayama's second collaboration single since "Sekaijū no Dare Yori Kitto" in 1992. Co-writer Okamoto performed backing vocals on the song; she later on self-covered the song as "Will... (Mirai e no Present)" on her 1997 album Smile.

The song was used as the theme song of the Fuji TV drama series , which also starred Nakayama. The B-side, "Darlin", was used by Astel Tokyo on a commercial that also featured Nakayama.

"Mirai e no Present" peaked at No. 6 on Oricon's weekly singles chart, becoming her last career top-10 single. It sold over 409,000 copies and was Nakayama's last single to be certified Platinum by the RIAJ.

Track listing

Charts

Certification

References

External links

1996 singles
1996 songs
Japanese-language songs
Japanese television drama theme songs
Miho Nakayama songs
King Records (Japan) singles